The Porter's Hall Theatre was a small theatre in London, it existed for a short while in 1616. The licence for its construction was revoked around its date of completion, and few records of it survive.

Location
Porter's Hall Theatre was constructed in Blackfriars by Philip Rosseter, the manager of the Queen's Revels company, after he lost his lease on the Whitefriars Theatre in 1614. It received a royal license on 3 June 1615, allowing it to be used by the Queen's Revels Prince Charles', and Lady Elizabeth's Players.

History
The city was opposed to the construction of another theatre, and a petition was given against the construction to Sir Edward Coke, Lord Chief Justice, in August 1615. On 26 September it was ordered that the license for the playhouse did not allow it to be constructed in the city, and that all building work must stop.

Legal arguments from Rosseter and his two fellow investors, Philip Kingman and Ralph Reeve, went back and forth until 27 January 1617, when the king gave his consent that the playhouse should be pulled down. By this time it would appear that construction of the theatre was completed.

Performances
Nathan Field's Amends for Ladies was printed in 1618 'As it was acted at the Blacke Fryers, both by the Princes Seruants, and the Lady Elizabeths'; and there is no difficulty in supposing that the play was produced at the Porter's Hall theatre in late 1616 or early 1617.

References

Former theatres in London